Paul Wiens (17 August 1922 – 6 April 1982) was a German poet, translator and author of radio plays and screenplays in the German Democratic Republic.

Life 
Wiens was born in Königsberg to a Jewish mother. However, he spent his childhood in Berlin until his mother emigrated to Switzerland in 1933 after the "Machtergreifung" by the National Socialists. After passing his school-leaving exams, he took up philosophy studies in Geneva and Lausanne.

After the end of the Second World War, he returned to Berlin in 1947 via Weimar, where he worked as an editor and translation editor at Aufbau-Verlag until 1950. Along the way, he published his first poems and youth songs (Begeistert von Berlin, 1952). From 1952 onwards, he was a freelance writer and wrote mainly poetry and texts for mass songs. Wiens also wrote screenplays, for example for Frank Vogel's film  (1962), which justifies the Berlin Wall, and for Konrad Wolf's Sonnensucher (1958). The film deals with the production battles in the uranium mining of Soviet-German Joint Stock Company Wismut and, because of its thematic connection to the production of nuclear weapons, was not premiered until 1972 due to a veto by the Soviet Union at the time. Furthermore, he translated works by Pablo Neruda, Vladimir Mayakovsky, Nazim Hikmet and others into German. Wiens was co-editor of the poetry series "Antwortet uns" (Answer us) and editor-in-chief of the influential literary magazine Sinn und Form in 1982 until his death in Berlin at the age of 59.

Wiens was temporarily vice-president of the Cultural Association of the GDR and from 1961 to 1969 chairman of the Berlin district association of the writers' association of the GDR. In 1964, he became a member of the German P.E.N. Centre East and was a member of its executive committee from 1980.

Wiens was buried in the artists' section of Berlin's Zentralfriedhof Friedrichsfelde. His estate is in the literary archive of the Academy of Arts, Berlin.

Wiens' daughter Maja Wiens from his first marriage to Erika Lautenschlager (1921-1989) is also a writer (novel Traumgrenzen, Berlin: Neues Leben 1983 / screenplay Versteckte Fallen DEFA 1991).

Collaborator with the State Security 
In the 1960s, Wiens worked as a "social informant" with the Stasi. At the end of the 1960s, he interrupted this activity for a few years because of "ideological stomach ache", then continued it from 1972 until his death as an unofficial collaborator. He also repeatedly worked for the Soviet KGB. Wiens "handed over private letters addressed to him, provided detailed denunciatory information on writers from East and West and reported on international writers' meetings in the Soviet Union, Hungary and Yugoslavia", according to Joachim Walther in his standard work Sicherungsbereich Literatur. He provided reports on his GDR colleagues Jurek Becker, Wolf Biermann, Franz Fühmann, Stefan Heym, Sarah Kirsch, Heiner Müller, Ulrich Plenzdorf and Erwin Strittmatter, among others, the Western writers Heinrich Böll, Günter Grass, and Andrei Sakharov, as well as his third wife, the writer Irmtraud Morgner, who divorced him in 1977. He received several state awards for his informer activities.

Filmography 
 1953: Das kleine und das große Glück
 1955: Einmal ist keinmal
 1956: Genesung
 1958: Meister Zacharias und seine acht goldenen Zeiger
 1958: Das Lied der Matrosen
 1960: Leute mit Flügeln
 1961: 
 1962: 
 1972: Sonnensucher
 1978: Matrosen in Berlin (Liedtexte) Radio play 
 1978: Isaak Babel: Maria (as narrator) – director: Joachim Staritz (radio play – Rundfunk der DDR)

 Awards 
 1952: 
 1959: Nationalpreis der DDR
 1962: Heinrich-Heine-Preis des Ministeriums für Kultur der DDR
 1973: Verdienstmedaille der NVA in Bronze
 1974: Verdienstmedaille der NVA in Silber
 1976: Johannes-R.-Becher-Medaille
 1973: Verdienstmedaille der NVA in Gold
 1977: Vaterländischer Verdienstorden in Bronze
 1979: Vaterländischer Verdienstorden in Gold
 1980: Medal Brotherhood in Arms in Bronze

 References 

 Further reading 
 Bernd-Rainer Barth  on WWW-DDR
 Annegret von Wietersheim: Aber - ist mein liebster laut. Ambivalenzen in Biographie und lyrischem Werk von Paul Wiens. Universitätsverlag Winter, Heidelberg 2014 (Diss. Universität Bremen 2014).
 Annegret von Wietersheim: Paul Wiens: "Meteore". Eine Neuzuordnung der Autorschaft. In lendemains.'' Attempto 162/163, 41. Jg., Tübingen 2016, .

External links 

 
 Paul-Wiens-Archiv im Archiv der Academy of Arts, Berlin

20th-century German poets
German male poets
German radio writers
People of the KGB
Recipients of the Patriotic Order of Merit in gold
1922 births
1982 deaths
Writers from Königsberg
20th-century German screenwriters
German male screenwriters
20th-century German male writers